Kalmer may be a male given name or a family name. People:

Given name
 Kalmer Lain (born 1968), Estonian politician
 Kalmer Tennosaar (1928–2004), Estonian singer, television presenter and journalist

Surname
 Dewey Kalmer, American college baseball coach
 Joseph Kalmer (1898–1959), Austrian writer
 René Kalmer (born 1980), South African runner

Estonian masculine given names